Willard Schrader (May 5, 1883 – June 24, 1971) was an American gymnast. He competed in three events at the 1904 Summer Olympics.

References

External links
 

1883 births
1971 deaths
American male artistic gymnasts
Olympic gymnasts of the United States
Athletes (track and field) at the 1904 Summer Olympics
Gymnasts at the 1904 Summer Olympics
People from Marion, Indiana